Chances Are is a 1989 American romantic comedy film directed by Emile Ardolino and starring Cybill Shepherd, Robert Downey Jr., Ryan O'Neal, and Mary Stuart Masterson in Panavision. The original music score was composed by Maurice Jarre.

Plot
Louie Jeffries, a young district attorney, is hit by a car and dies in 1964, but manages to slip by the pearly gates and is instantly reborn. In 1987, 23 years later, his widow Corinne still misses him, ignoring the frustrated devotion of his best friend Phillip Train, who has pretty much raised Louie's only daughter Miranda as his own. Miranda, while a student at Yale University, meets Alex Finch, who works in the library but is about to graduate.

After graduation, Alex heads to Washington, D.C., where he makes his way to the offices of The Washington Post. His first attempts to meet with Ben Bradlee thwarted, he schemes his way into Bradlee's office by pretending to be a delivery man. Alex walks into Bradlee's office, with Phillip behind him. Confounded by the young man, Bradlee asks who he is. When Alex attempts to remind him of their meeting at Yale, Phillip vouches for him, which changes his mind about giving him a meeting. Unfortunately, Bradlee feels Alex needs more time working on smaller papers before he can offer him a job. Feeling defeated, Alex leaves his office.

Phillip finds Alex downstairs in the lobby, who offers Phillip a ride, during which Phillip invites Alex to meet the Jeffries family over dinner. While at the Jeffries' home, which he'd never previously been to, Alex begins to have flashbacks of a previous life. Anguished, he begins to act crazed and confused. Putting the pieces together, Alex realizes he is Louie Jeffries, Corinne's dead husband, reincarnated.

Miranda, wanting to continue the flirtation that started when they met, is confused when Alex rebuffs her and orders her to go to her room when she kisses him. Alex then goes to Corrine and tries to convince Corrine that he's Louie. At first she doesn't believe him, but he tells her details about their earlier life together that only Louie would know. She finally gives in and they kiss. They take a trip together away from town, but Corrine is a little disturbed when people think Alex is her son. Louie/Alex wants to make love, but Corrine reveals she hasn't had sex since Louie died.

One night when Alex and Corrine are together, they're caught by Phillip, who accuses Alex of being a gold digger. Louie/Alex then reminds Phillip he declared his love for Corinne to Louie on their wedding day. Phillip is confused and tries to punch Alex but he gets punched instead, knocking him out. Corinne rushes to Phillip's side, and yells at Alex to get out of the room. Louie/Alex realizes then that she loves Phillip too, and Louie must let go.

Corrine slips a note under Alex's door, saying she's sorry, and she'll visit him later. Alex puts the still-unconscious Phillip in his bed, so that when Corinne arrives, thinking he's Louie, she accidentally kisses Phillip. He's ecstatic, and Corinne realizes she loves him too. They make love.

Alex spends the night in his car. The next day, he bursts into a courtroom and accuses the judge of accepting a bribe (Alex remembers himself as Louie taking the incriminating photographs of the then younger judge back in 1964). Phillip, who's also in the courtroom, realizes only Louie would know that fact, and now believes Alex is Louie. Alex tells Phillip the location of his camera with the photographs of the judge accepting the bribe. Attempting to escape from the commotion in the courtroom, Alex falls down the stairs, hits his head, and ends up in the hospital. While unconscious, Omar the angel visits Alex, and gives him the special "shot" he should have gotten 23 years previous, to forget his past life.

When Alex wakes, he's completely forgotten about being Louie, and he tells Miranda that the last thing he remembers is their kissing in the kitchen of her house. Miranda is relieved and delighted. Newspaper headlines show the judge charged with accepting the bribe. Impressed by Alex's journalistic prowess in exposing the corrupt judge, Bradlee offers him a job as a reporter at the Post. Corinne and Phillip get married, and at their wedding, Alex tells Phillip he's in love with Miranda, just as Phillip told Louie he was in love with Corinne on their wedding day all those years earlier.

Cast
 Cybill Shepherd as Corinne Jeffries
 Robert Downey Jr. as Alex Finch/Louie Jeffries
 Ryan O'Neal as Phillip Train
 Mary Stuart Masterson as Miranda Jeffries
 Christopher McDonald as Louie Jeffries
 Josef Sommer as Judge Fenwick
 Joe Grifasi as Omar
 Henderson Forsythe as Ben Bradlee
 Fran Ryan as Mavis Talmadge
 James Noble as Dr. Bailey
 Marc McClure as Richard
 Susan Ruttan as Woman in the Bookstore
 Mimi Kennedy as Sally
 Kathleen Freeman as Mrs. Handy
 Dennis Patrick as Archibald Blair
 Martin Garner as Mr. Zellerbach
 Gianni Russo as Anthony Bonino
 Lester Lanin as Conductor

Production

The film was known prior to production as Life After Life and Unforgettable.

Chances Are was Cybill Shepherd's first film in a number of years. Her profile had risen since she starred in the television series Moonlighting, and she made the film during a production hiatus from the series.

Many scenes were filmed in Georgetown, along the Mall, Glen Echo Park, Smithsonian museums, and other parts of Washington, D.C.

Reception

Chances Are received generally positive reviews from critics, but did not do well at the box office. As of October 2019, the film holds a rating of 67% on Rotten Tomatoes from 30 reviews.

Awards and nominations

Soundtrack
The soundtrack included the Billboards Top 10 single hit song "After All" (composed by Tom Snow and lyrics by Dean Pitchford) performed by Cher and Peter Cetera. The song peaked at #6 on the Billboard Hot 100 in May 1989. Another is the song of the same title as the film sung by Johnny Mathis. Although the film contains other songs, a soundtrack album has never been released.

See also
 List of films about angels

References

External links
 
 
 
 
 
 

1989 films
1980s fantasy comedy films
1989 romantic comedy films
1980s romantic fantasy films
American fantasy comedy films
American romantic comedy films
American romantic fantasy films
Films about reincarnation
Films directed by Emile Ardolino
Films scored by Maurice Jarre
Films set in 1964
Films set in 1987
Films shot in California
Films shot in Maryland
Films shot in Washington, D.C.
TriStar Pictures films
Films set in Washington, D.C.
1980s English-language films
1980s American films